Cape Enniberg is a cliff located on the Island of Viðoy.

Enniberg is the northernmost point of the Faroe Islands. At the southern foot of the nearby  mountain, Villingadalsfjall, lies the town of Viðareiði. In summer, boat trips run to Cape Enniberg, which is also the site of an important bird colony.

See also
Extreme points of the Faroe Islands

References

External links 
 Tours to Cape Enniberg

Headlands of the Faroe Islands
Mountains of the Faroe Islands
Faroe Islands